David Foenkinos (born 28 October 1974) is a French author and screenwriter. He studied literature and music in Paris.
His novel La délicatesse is a bestseller in France. A film based on the book was released in December 2011, with Audrey Tautou as the main character. In 2014 he was awarded Prix Renaudot for his novel "Charlotte".

Filmography
 2011 : Delicacy
 2017 : Jalouse
 2018 : I Feel Better
 2019 : The Mystery of Henri Pick
 2020 : Fantasies

Bibliography 
 Inversion de l'idiotie : de l'influence de deux Polonais (2001)
 Entre les oreilles (2002)
 Erotic Potential of My Wife (Le Potentiel érotique de ma femme) (2004)
 En cas de bonheur (2005) 
 Les Cœurs autonomes (2006) 
 Qui se souvient de David Foenkinos ? (2007)
 Nos séparations (2008)
 Delicacy (La délicatesse) (2009)
 Bernard (2010)
 Lennon (2010)
 Les souvenirs (2011)
 Le petit garçon qui disait toujours non (2011)
 Je vais mieux (2012)
 Charlotte (2014)
 Le Mystère Henri Pick (2016)
 Vers la beauté (2018)
Deux sœurs (2019)
 La famille Martin (2020)
Numéro deux (2022)

References

External links 

Writers from Paris
1974 births
Living people
21st-century French novelists
French male screenwriters
French screenwriters
French male novelists
Prix Renaudot winners
Roger Nimier Prize winners
Prix Goncourt des lycéens winners
21st-century French male writers
21st-century French screenwriters